MEGA (a recursive acronym standing for MEGA Encrypted Global Access) is a cloud storage and file hosting service offered by MEGA Limited, a company based in Auckland, New Zealand. The service is offered through web-based apps. MEGA mobile apps are also available for Android and iOS. The website and service was launched on 19 January 2013, by Kim Dotcom, together with chief technical officer, director, and co-founder Mathias Ortmann, chief marketing officer Finn Batato and Bram van der Kolk.

Data encryption 
Data on Mega services is end-to-end encrypted client-side using the AES algorithm. Since Mega does not know the encryption keys to uploaded files, they cannot decrypt and view the content. Therefore, they cannot be responsible for the contents of uploaded files. By encrypting files MEGA can work with a larger number of data hosting companies around the world, decreasing the likelihood of a Megaupload-style seizure of servers by one government. MEGA also uses CloudRAID technology, which means files are split into roughly equal-sized parts and stored in different countries. They also store another part in yet another country recording whether the number of "1" bits at a certain position within all parts is even or odd. This means that users can reconstruct data even when one of the parts is unavailable.

In the first few weeks after the Mega launch, various security problems were found that researchers said an attacker could use to gain access to a logged-in user's files. In response, Mega started a vulnerability reward program which offers a reward of up to €10,000 for reporting security problems to MEGA.

Account options 
Free account users receive:
20 GB of base storage quota (5 GB of bandwidth per day)
Additional storage allowances can be activated through various "achievements", but expire after 365 days. No maximum storage.
Paid account users are provided with four tiers of options:
400 GB storage (1 TB of bandwidth per month)
2 TB storage (2 TB of bandwidth per month)
8 TB storage (8 TB of bandwidth per month)
16 TB storage (16 TB of bandwidth per month)
Business accounts
3 users minimum
3 TB storage (3 TB of bandwidth per month)
Additional TB's of storage or bandwidth can be purchased with no upper limit

Transparency 
Mega publishes an SDK as well as source code of all their client applications under the Mega Limited Code Review Licence, a proprietary source-available license which only permits usage of the code "for the purposes of review and commentary". The source code was released after former director Kim Dotcom stated that he would "create a Mega competitor that is completely open source and non-profit" following his departure from Mega Ltd.

MEGA also releases a yearly transparency report that publishes statistics on takedown requests, subscriber information disclosure and related issues. This is intended to provide transparency for users, regulatory bodies and suppliers as to Mega's operating processes relating to privacy and to statutory compliance. According to the latest 2021 report, MEGA now has over 230 million registered users in more than 200 countries and territories. In total, Mega's users have uploaded more than 100 billion distinct files.

History 
MEGA was founded after file-hosting site Megaupload was seized and shut down on 19 January 2012 by the United States Department of Justice, which began criminal cases against its owners. After Gabon denied the new company domain name me.ga, MEGA announced it would instead be registered in the country of residence of its founders, New Zealand, under the domain name mega.co.nz. Mega launched on 19 January 2013 – exactly a year after Megaupload was shut down. It was founded by Kim Dotcom, Bram van der Kolk, Finn Batato, and Mathias Ortmann. Dotcom reported on Twitter MEGA had over 100,000 registered users within the first hour, speculating that this may make Mega the fastest-growing startup in history. Kim Dotcom also reported on Twitter that the site was extremely busy, and received thousands of user registrations per minute at the time of the tweet. Kim later reported Mega having more than 1 million registered users, and 60 uploads completed every second. Three days later that number was updated to 500 uploads completed every second.

Early users of the site experienced various issues due to the site's popularity, including slow-to-nonexistent upload speeds and problems logging in. The service improved slightly over the next three days, but remained insufficient for large volumes of uploads. Others said there appeared to be no way to close an account in case it got compromised. Technology commentators blamed the poor performance on the site's popularity, noting it was ranked in the top 150 websites in the world in the first few days of its existence, subsequently dropping a few thousand places.

Mega launched in 2013 as a cloud service with a tagline of "The Privacy Company". On 4 July 2013, the Mega Android application was released on the Google Play marketplace. Four days later, on 8 July 2013, the Mega software development kit (SDK) and affiliate program was released. On 4 September 2013, Kim Dotcom stepped down as Director of Mega so he could pursue his political ambitions with the Internet Party. In a later interview with the Washington Post on 7 September, Kim Dotcom announced Mega was getting 20,000 signups for the service every day. Furthermore, in 2013 Mega was receiving about 100 DMCA takedowns per day. On 26 November 2013, the official Mega iOS application was released on the App Store marketplace. On 20 January 2014, the official MEGAsync application was released for Windows and on 6 September 2014, the official MEGAsync application was released for Linux.

In March 2014, chief executive Stephen Hall announced intentions to list MEGA on the New Zealand Stock Exchange. In September, a report published from the Digital Citizens Alliance – commissioned via brand protection organization NetNames – characterising Mega as a 'shadowy cyberlocker' was branded "grossly untrue and highly defamatory" by Mega's CEO.

In July 2015, in a Q&A session with tech website Slashdot, Dotcom mentioned he was no longer involved with Mega. Neither in a managing nor in a shareholder capacity. Dotcom also mentions he will launch an open-source competitor to MEGA. This competitor was supposed to be launched in 2014 but development and launch seem to be delayed indefinitely.

In January 2016, Mega announced that the service has 35 million registered users that have uploaded 12 billion files.

Later in 2016, Mega Ltd. released the source code to their client-side software under the Mega Limited Code Review License, a source-available software license, on GitHub. This allows independent verification of the correctness and integrity of the implementation of MEGA's cryptographic model and service reliability.

In 2020, it reached a user-base of 195 million users. This was also its first year turning a profit.

In 2021, Mega added a domain name to include Mega.io and Mega.nz. The .io domain was chosen to reflect the global nature of MEGA which has more than 200 million registered users in over 215 countries/territories. MEGA continues to say that the .io pages are also more likely to be properly indexed by search engines than the current .nz pages, which are often incorrectly treated as only being relevant to New Zealand searches.

Later in 2021, Mega shared their transparency report where they record 230 million registered users storing 107 billion files.

User files can be deleted by the administration at any time without the possibility of recovery.

Limitations 
According to Mega, the site works with all major current browsers, but there can be some inconveniences to using browsers other than Google Chrome, Mozilla Firefox, Opera, Vivaldi or Microsoft Edge. For example, with Safari, MEGA runs into some limitations.

New features

MEGAchat 
In February 2013, Mega announced it would be expanding into e-mail, chat, voice, video, and mobile. In December 2014, MEGA said it would "soon" launch a browser-based chat service. In mid-January 2015, Mega launched MegaChat in beta, marketed as a web-based, encrypted alternative to applications like Skype and FaceTime.

Browser extension 
Mega released a browser plugin extension called MEGA Chrome Extension in 2015. It was advertised as reducing loading times, improving downloading performance, and strengthening security. Mega also released a browser extension for Firefox.

On 5 September 2018, it was reported that the extension on the Chrome Web Store was compromised by the addition of code designed to steal website credentials and cryptocurrency. The original code on the GitHub page was not affected.

See also 
 Comparison of file hosting services
 Comparison of file synchronization software
 Comparison of online backup services

References

External links 
 

Cloud storage
File hosting
File sharing services
Internet properties established in 2013
Kim Dotcom
Internet technology companies of New Zealand
New Zealand brands
New Zealand websites
New Zealand companies established in 2013
Computer companies established in 2013